Tricliona is a genus of leaf beetles in the subfamily Eumolpinae. It contains at least 35 species, and is distributed from India and Southern China to the Philippines and New Guinea.

Species
The following species are placed in the genus:

 Tricliona armata (Jacoby, 1889)
 Tricliona bakeri Moseyko, 2011
 Tricliona bengalensis (Jacoby, 1908)
 Tricliona bicolor Jacoby, 1895
 Tricliona bifasciata Jacoby, 1895
 Tricliona ceylonensis Jacoby, 1908
 Tricliona consobrina Chen, 1935
 Tricliona costipennis Chen, 1935
 Tricliona episternalis (Weise, 1922)
 Tricliona fasciata Lefèvre, 1885
 Tricliona ferruginea (Weise, 1922)
 Tricliona fulvifrons Jacoby, 1899
 Tricliona inconspicua Jacoby, 1908
 Tricliona indica Jacoby, 1900
 Tricliona lakshmi Takizawa, 1984
 Tricliona laevicollis (Jacoby, 1887)
 Tricliona laotica Medvedev, 2000
 Tricliona longicornis Jacoby, 1908
 Tricliona marginata Jacoby, 1908
 Tricliona melanura Lefèvre, 1890
 Tricliona microdentata Medvedev & Sprecher-Uebersax, 1999
 Tricliona minuta Medvedev, 2000
 Tricliona nigra Jacoby, 1908
 Tricliona nigrofasciata Jacoby, 1896
 Tricliona nigromaculata Lefèvre, 1885
 Tricliona oculata Medvedev & Takizawa, 2011
 Tricliona paksensis Kimoto & Gressitt, 1982
 Tricliona philippina Moseyko, 2011
 Tricliona picea Jacoby, 1895
 Tricliona puncticeps Duvivier, 1891
 Tricliona quinquemaculata (Jacoby, 1887)
 Tricliona raapi (Jacoby, 1889)
 Tricliona sandakana Moseyko, 2011
 Tricliona semivittata (Baly, 1864)
 Tricliona subdepressa Jacoby, 1908
 Tricliona suratthanica Romantsov & Moseyko, 2016
 Tricliona suturalis Kimoto & Gressitt, 1982
 Tricliona tonkinensis (Lefèvre, 1893)
 Tricliona trangica Romantsov & Moseyko, 2016
 Tricliona trimaculata Romantsov & Moseyko, 2016
 Tricliona tristis Medvedev, 2001
 Tricliona variabilis Jacoby, 1895

Synonyms:
 Tricliona apicata Jacoby, 1895: synonym of Tricliona puncticeps Duvivier, 1891
 Tricliona glabricollis Jacoby, 1908 (replacement name for Tricliona laevicollis Jacoby, 1900): synonym of Colaspoides sublaevicollis Duvivier, 1892
 Tricliona laevicollis Jacoby, 1900 (preoccupied name): synonym of Colaspoides sublaevicollis Duvivier, 1892
 Tricliona oblonga (Motschulsky, 1866): moved to Basilepta
 Tricliona sulcatipennis Jacoby, 1896: moved to Rhyparida
 Tricliona sulcipennis Jacoby, 1904: moved to Rhyparida

References

Eumolpinae
Chrysomelidae genera
Beetles of Asia
Taxa named by Édouard Lefèvre